The 1982 Pittsburgh Steelers season was the franchise's 50th in the National Football League. The Steelers returned to the playoffs after missing the playoffs for two years. This was also the Steelers 50th Anniversary season. Although the season was shortened as a result of the 1982 strike, the Steelers finished a strong 6–3 record, good enough for fourth in the AFC as a whole. Although division standings were thrown out as a result of the strike, the Steelers unofficially finished second in the AFC Central, one game behind defending AFC Champion Cincinnati.

The 1982 season is best remembered as the final seasons for Hall of Famers Lynn Swann and Jack Ham and the "unofficial" final season of fellow Hall of Famer Terry Bradshaw, who would miss much of the 1983 season due to injuries before retiring. On the flip side, it would also be the first year of placekicker Gary Anderson and the first year of the team using a 3-4 defense, a style still used by the team as of 2019.

The Steelers would lose in the first round of the playoffs to the San Diego Chargers, in what would be the last home playoff game for the Steelers for the next ten years.

Personnel

Staff

Roster

Offseason
The 1982 offseason was the start of a slow transition period for the team, as the defensive line was hit with key retirements in "Mean Joe" Greene and L. C. Greenwood. Partially due to the team losing two key players and partially due to the need to go up against a more wide-open NFL, head coach Chuck Noll switched from the traditional 4–3 defensive alignment (four lineman & three linebackers) to the 3–4 (three lineman & four linebackers). The Steelers would more than make a good transition to the 3–4, as many teams have since tried to copy the Steelers success with the 3–4 alignment, especially since 2001, when the Steelers were the only team in the NFL with the alignment but led the league in defense.

1982 did see the Steelers sign a rookie placekicker from Syracuse named Gary Anderson, claiming him off waivers from Buffalo just before the start of the season. Anderson would stay in Pittsburgh for the next 13 season and play an additional 10 with four other teams to become the Steelers' all-time leading scorer. He retired after the 2004 season as the NFL's all-time leading scorer, a record since surpassed by Morten Andersen.

Preseason

Regular season

Schedule 

Note: Intra-division opponents are in bold text.

Game summaries

Week 1 at Cowboys

Week 2: vs. Cincinnati Bengals

Week 3: vs. New York Giants 
Cancelled due to player's strike.

Week 4: at Denver Broncos 
Cancelled due to player's strike.

Week 5: vs. Philadelphia Eagles 
Cancelled due to player's strike.

Week 6: at Washington Redskins 
Cancelled due to player's strike.

Week 7: vs. Cleveland Browns 
Postponed due to player's strike.

Week 8: at Cincinnati Bengals 
Cancelled due to player's strike.

Week 9: vs. Houston Oilers 
Cancelled due to player's strike.

Week 10: vs. New York Jets 
Cancelled due to player's strike.

Week 11: at Houston Oilers

Week 12: at Seattle Seahawks

Week 13: vs. Kansas City Chiefs

Week 14: at Buffalo Bills

Week 15: at Cleveland Browns

Week 16: vs. New England Patriots

Week 17: vs. Cleveland Browns

Standings

Postseason

Game summary

First Round/Wild Card: vs. San Diego Chargers  
The Pittsburgh Steelers wildcard match-up against the San Diego Chargers at Three Rivers Stadium on Jan. 9, 1983 would go down in history as one of the greatest post season games of Bradshaw’s Hall of Fame career, as well as one of the most bitter defeats in franchise history.

The game began with Chargers RB-James Brooks dropping the opening kickoff at the 3-yard line. Brooks frantically struggled to get control of the ball that was bouncing around on the cold turf as the Steelers special teams was quickly advancing towards him. Unfortunately, for Brooks and the Chargers the ball was recovered by Steelers LB-Gary Ruff in the end zone to give Pittsburgh a quick 7–0 lead after only 12-seconds into the contest. On the ensuing Steelers kickoff, Brooks dropped another return in almost the exact same manner as the first, except this time Brooks was able to recover his fumble after diving on top of the loose ball at the 2-yard line, like it was a live hand grenade. 

From there, the Chargers began to turn their misfortunes around by mostly passing the ball for 77-yards on 12-plays and putting some points on the scoreboard after future Hall of Fame kicker Rolf Benirschke booted a 25-yard field goal to make it a manageable 7–3 game after a disastrous start for the Chargers. However, the Steelers immediately responded with a long touchdown drive of their own that ended with a 1-yard plunge by QB-Terry Bradshaw to give the Steelers their biggest lead of the game 14–3.

Now down by 11-points with 5-minutes left in the 1st-quarter, the Chargers finally handled the kick return without a major incident occurring, then drove the ball down the field resulting in James Brooks self-redeeming 18-yard rushing touchdown early in the 2nd-quarter to make it a 14–10 game, and once again pulling within just 4-points of the Steelers. Then, after a quick Steelers possession and a punt, the Chargers put together a long time consuming offensive drive that came to a disappointing end after CB-Mel Blount recovered a fumble by TE-Kellen Winslow at the Pittsburgh 7-yard line. 

With the ball back, Bradshaw drove the Steelers offense to the Chargers 29-yard line, until he threw a long pass that sailed way over the head of a leaping WR-Lynn Swann. The Chargers SS-Bruce Laired intercepted Bradshaw's over thrown pass at the 3-yard line and returned it to their own 35, where San Diego's offense went back to work with 2-minutes left in the half. After Dan Fouts connected with WR-Wes Chandler for a 33-yard reception giving the Chargers a 1st-and-10 at the Steelers 23-yard line. Two plays later, Fouts connected with WR-Scott Fitzkee for a 10-yard TD pass that gave the Chargers a surprising 17–14 half-time lead.           

Despite the shocking 1st-half turn of events, the 2nd-half belonged almost entirely to Bradshaw and the Steelers. At one point Bradshaw completed 15 passes in a row, threw 2-TD passes that put the Steelers back in the lead with a commanding 28–17 score early in the 4th-quarter after hitting WR-John Stallworth on a 3rd-and-9 for a 14-yard touchdown. Bradshaw finished his last playoff appearance with 28-completions in 39-attempts for 335-yards, 1-rushing and 2-passing TD's. But, Bradshaw also threw two interceptions, which shifted all the games momentum back to the Chargers who responded with a touchdown each time. 

Just prior to Bradshaw throwing his 2nd interception, the Steelers were solidly holding on to a 28–17 lead with 11-minutes remaining in the game. However, when Pittsburgh faced a 3rd-and-8 at their own 20-yrd line, predictably Bradshaw dropped back to pass. Then, after escaping the Chargers aggressive pass rush by moving up into the pocket before scrambling outside to his right where there was no one within 10-yards of him in either direction, and he could've run forward for the 1st-down. However, instead of running for it, Bradshaw slung the ball wildly back across the field toward a well covered Lynn Swann. The pass was easily intercepted by Chargers CB-Jeff Allen and returned to the Steelers 29-yard line.

Despite Bradshaw's reckless 4th-quarter interception, Mel Blount appeared to have saved the Steelers season after intercepting Dan Fouts 19-yard pass attempt into the end zone. However, Blount's 2nd-defensive turnover of the game was nullified by a holding penalty against the defense. With new life, Fouts moved the Chargers offense down the field for their 1st-score in the 2nd-half that came on an 8-yard TD pass to Winslow with 8:50 left in the game, that once again cut the Steelers seemingly insurmountable 11-point lead to within 4-points.

Now feeling the pressure of holding on to a tenuous 28–24 lead, the Steelers needed a solid offensive possession and score to finally secure the win. While the Steelers were able to grind out a few time consuming 1st-downs to get close to midfield, John Goodson had to come on to punt. But instead of pinning the Chargers deep, Goodson (a barefoot punter) shanked one for only 20 yards to the Chargers 36-yard line.

With just under 4-minutes remaining and 64-yards away from the end zone, Fouts combined both the Chargers formidable passing attack with a balanced rushing attack (which featured RB-Chuck Muncie) to methodically move the ball down the field against the once legendary "Steel Curtain" defense that was now an aging and tired relic of their former glory. Then, with 1-minute left to play, Fouts threw a 12-yard screen-pass to Winslow for the winning touchdown, making the final score 31–28, and eliminating the Steelers from the tournament.

References

External links
 1982 Pittsburgh Steelers season at Profootballreference.com 
 1982 Pittsburgh Steelers season statistics at jt-sw.com 
50th season news feature

Pittsburgh Steelers seasons
Pittsburgh Steelers
Pitts